Alguien te mira may refer to:

 Alguien te mira (Chilean TV series)
 Alguien te mira (American TV series)